Gravitational memory effects, also known as gravitational-wave memory effects are predicted persistent changes in the relative position of pairs of masses in space due to the passing of a gravitational wave. Detection of gravitational memory effects has been suggested as a way of validating Einstein's Theory of General Relativity.

There are two kinds of predicted gravitational memory effect: a linear phenomenon, first proposed in 1974 by Russian scientists; and a non-linear phenomenon known as the nonlinear memory effect, which was first proposed in the 1990s.

Research on the predicted phenomena has been carried out by Ya. B. Zel'dovich and A. G. Polnarev, V. B. Braginsky and L. P. Grishchuk, and Demetrios Christodoulou.

Detection 

The effect should, in theory, be detectable by recording changes in the distance between pairs of free-falling objects in spacetime before and after the passage of gravitational waves. The proposed LISA detector is expected to detect the memory effect easily. In contrast, detection with the existing LIGO is complicated by two factors. First, LIGO detection targets a higher frequency range than is desirable for detection of memory effects. Secondly, LIGO is not in free-fall, and its parts will drift back to their equilibrium position following the passage of the gravitational waves. However, as thousands of events from LIGO and similar earth-based detectors are recorded and statistically analyzed over the course of several years, the cumulative data may be sufficient to confirm the existence of the gravitational memory effect.

References

External links 
 Gravitational-wave memory: an overview by Marc Favata

Astronomy
General relativity